Damadol is a 2013 Indian Bengali film directed by Manoj Michigan and produced by Ajay Jhunjhunwala.

Plot 
The movie consists of three main characters Aditiya, Nikhil and VK.Aditya is guy who dreams to become a filmmaker. He desperately tries to fulfill his dream but does not get finance. VK loves a girl but never able to express it to her. Nikhil works in a corporate office and wants to get married. Nikihl's Father arranged a girl named Ria. It turn out to be same girl who VK mad about. Aditiya came up with plan to help VK to get his love of life. Aditiya meets Papu Bhai using VK's connection as return favour. Papu Bhai loves films and item songs and agrees to finance Aditya's film. Ankita is an air hostess, close friend of Ria and Aditiya's fiancée. Twist starts in the story when their plan back fired.

Cast 
 Samadarshi Dutta as Aditya
 Anindita Banerjee as Ankita
 Saheb Bhattacharya as Nikhil 
 Gunjan Daryanani as Tanya
 Rajdeep Gupta as VK 
 Priyanka as Ria
 Saswata Chatterjee as Papu Bhai
 Ritabhari Chakraborty
 Niharica Raizada as item number

Soundtrack
The Music was composed by Gourab Chatterjee, Harish Lakhmani, Arya Acharya and released by Kaleidoscope Entertainment.

References

External links
 

Bengali-language Indian films
2010s Bengali-language films